Trypanorhyncha is an order of cestodes, a type of flatworm.

Some species infect gamefish, such as sciaenids, during the parasitic worm's plerocercoid stage, and are commonly called spaghetti worm because of their appearance, approximating cooked spaghetti.  Such species include Poecilancistrium caryophyllum and Pseudogrillotia pleistacantha.

Their scolex, or head region, has 2 to 4 bothria, or sucking grooves that cling onto the host. They have four retractable tentacles.

Gallery

References 

Cestoda
Platyhelminthes orders